is a Japanese manga series written and illustrated by Masaki Enjoji. It was serialized in Shogakukan's seinen manga magazine Monthly Big Comic Spirits from January 2014 to October 2015, with its chapters collected in three tankōbon volumes.

Publication
Written and illustrated by Masaki Enjoji, Santiago: Rebellion Shimabara was serialized in Shogakukan's seinen manga magazine Monthly Big Comic Spirits from January 27, 2014, to October 27, 2015. Its twenty chapters were collected by Shogakukan in three tankōbon volumes, released from September 30, 2014, to December 11, 2015.

Volume list

References

Further reading

Historical anime and manga
Seinen manga
Shogakukan manga